Petrocosmea is a genus of the family Gesneriaceae, the African violet family. Most of the species within this genus are endemic to high-altitude areas in Western China, although some are native to other parts of Asia. It is a rosette forming genus that generally grows on wet mossy rocks or forests.

The genus was discovered in China by Augustine Henry and was first described in 1887 by Daniel Oliver (Prof. of Botany, University College, London).

Species

The genus contains around 25 species. The species listed below are taken from The Plant List
, unless otherwise indicated.

Petrocosmea barbata Craib
Petrocosmea begoniifolia C.Y. Wu ex H.W. Li
Petrocosmea cavaleriei H. Lév.
Petrocosmea coerulea C.Y. Wu ex W.T. Wang
Petrocosmea confluens W.T. Wang
Petrocosmea duclouxii Craib
Petrocosmea flaccida Craib
Petrocosmea forrestii Craib
Petrocosmea funingensis Zhang, Pan, Meng, Li, Xu & Li 
Petrocosmea grandiflora Hemsl.
Petrocosmea grandifolia W.T. Wang
Petrocosmea iodioides Hemsl.
Petrocosmea kerrii Craib (including Petrocosmea wardii W.W. Sm.)
Petrocosmea longipedicellata W.T. Wang
Petrocosmea mairei H. Lév.
Petrocosmea martini (H. Lév.) H. Lév.
Petrocosmea menglianensis H.W. Li
Petrocosmea minor Hemsl. (syn. Petrocosmea henryi Craib)
Petrocosmea nervosa Craib
Petrocosmea oblata Craib (including Petrocosmea latisepala W.T. Wang)
Petrocosmea qinlingensis W.T. Wang
Petrocosmea rosettifolia C.Y. Wu ex H.W. Li
Petrocosmea sericea C.Y. Wu ex H.W. Li
Petrocosmea sichuanensis Chun ex W.T. Wang
Petrocosmea sinensis Oliv.

A new species Petrocosmea cryptica  was described in 2011, long known in cultivation but mistakenly identified as P. rosettifolia.

A further eight names were considered "unresolved"; they may be extra species or synonyms of existing species:

Petrocosmea condorensis Pellegr.
Petrocosmea formosa B.L.Burtt
Petrocosmea heterophylla B.L.Burtt
Petrocosmea ionantha Baill.
Petrocosmea kingii (C.B.Clarke) Chatterjee
Petrocosmea parryorum C.E.C.Fisch.
Petrocosmea umbelliformis B.L.Burtt
Petrocosmea xingyiensis Y.G.Wei & F. Wen

References

 
Gesneriaceae genera
Taxa named by Daniel Oliver